The 2016 Girls' EuroHockey Youth Championships was the 9th edition of the Girls' EuroHockey Youth Championship. The tournament was held from 24 to 30 July 2016 in Cork, Ireland at the Mardyke Arena.

Netherlands won the tournament for the seventh time after defeating Germany 2–0 in the final.

Qualified teams
The following teams participated in the 2016 EuroHockey Youth Championship:

Format
The eight teams were split into two groups of four teams. The top two teams advanced to the semifinals to determine the winner in a knockout system. The bottom two teams played in a new group with the teams they did not play against in the group stage. The last two teams were relegated to the EuroHockey Youth Championship II.

Results

Preliminary round

Pool A

Pool B

Classification round

Fifth to eighth place classification

Pool C

First to fourth place classification

Semi-finals

Third and fourth place

Final

Statistics

Awards

Final standings

Goalscorers

References

Girls' EuroHockey Youth Championships
Youth
EuroHockey Youth Championships
EuroHockey Youth Championships
EuroHockey Youth Championships
International women's field hockey competitions hosted by Ireland
Sport in Cork (city)
EuroHockey Youth Championships